Lady Emily Foley (23 June 1805 – 1 January 1900) was a major landowner and benefactress in nineteenth-century England.

She was born Lady Emily Graham, the daughter of James Graham, 3rd Duke of Montrose in 1805. In 1832, she married The Hon. Edward Foley, who was fourteen years her senior. On his death in 1846, she gained control of extensive estates in Staffordshire, Herefordshire and Worcestershire. She also became Lady of the Manor of Wednesbury and of Great Malvern.

She presided over the rapid growth of Great Malvern during the middle of the nineteenth century. She placed many restrictions on building in the town, ensuring that all houses were well spaced, had large gardens, and maintained many trees. Her family name of Graham provided the name of Graham Road in the centre of the town, with its many large Victorian houses, including the Montrose Hotel.

She was also a substantial benefactor of many churches and schools in Great Malvern. She left no children and allowed the Stoke Edith estate in Herefordshire to pass to her husband's great-nephew Paul Henry Foley of Prestwood, Staffordshire.

Arms

References

1805 births
1900 deaths
19th-century English nobility
19th-century Scottish women
Emily
Daughters of British dukes
19th-century English landowners
19th-century women landowners
Emily
People associated with Malvern, Worcestershire
Women of the Victorian era
English women philanthropists
19th-century British businesspeople